The bass guitar is similar in appearance and construction to an electric guitar but with a longer neck and scale length and most usually four strings.

This is a partial list of Wikipedia articles about companies (past and present) under which electric bass guitars have been sold.

A 

 Alembic
 Ampeg
 Aria
 Audiovox

B 

 B.C. Rich
 BassLab
 Breedlove Guitars

C 

 C. F. Martin & Company
 Carl Thompson (luthier)
 Carvin Corporation
 Charvel
 Cort Guitars

D 

 Daisy Rock Guitars
 Danelectro
 Dean Guitars
 Dean Markley Strings
 Dingwall Designer Guitars

E 

 Eastwood Guitars
 Epiphone
 ESP Guitars

F 

 Fender
 Fernandes Guitars
 Fleabass
 Fodera
 Framus
 Fret-King

G 

 G&L Musical Instruments
 Gibson Guitar Corporation
 Godin Guitars
 Greco
 Greg Bennett Guitars
 Guild

H 

 Hamer Guitars
 Hagström
 Höfner
 Hohner
 Hondo
 Hora

I 

 Ibanez
 Italia Guitars

J    

 Jay Turser Guitars
 Jens Ritter Instruments
 Jerry Jones Guitars
 Jackson Guitars

K 

 Kawai
 Kiesel Guitars
 Kramer Guitars
 KxK Guitars
 Kay Musical Instrument Company

L 

 Lado Guitars
 Lakland
 Line 6
 Luna Guitars

M 

 M.V. Pedulla Guitars
 Maton
 Mayones Guitars & Basses
 Michael Kelly Guitars
 Michael Tobias Design
 Micro-Frets
 Modulus Guitars
 Music Man

N 

 National Reso-Phonic Guitars

O 

 Ovation

P 

 Parker Guitars
 Paul Reed Smith Guitars
 Peavey
 Pensa Custom Guitars

R 

 Reverend Guitars
 Rickenbacker
 Robin Guitars
 Ruokangas Guitars

S 

 Sadowsky
 Schecter Guitars
 Spector
 Steinberger
 Suhr Guitars

T 

 Tacoma Guitars
 Tagima
 Takamine
 Tanglewood Guitars
 Taylor Guitars
 Tobias
 Tonante
 Tyler Guitars

V 

 Veillette Guitars
 Vigier Guitars
 Vester Guitars
 Vintage Guitars
 Vox

W 

 Wal Basses
 Wandre Guitars
 Warwick
 Washburn Guitars
 Wechter Guitars

Y 

 Yamaha

Z 

 Zemaitis Guitars
 Zon Guitars

References

 
 
Guitar